Devadas is a 1989 Malayalam film, based on the Sharat Chandra Chattopadhyay novel, Devdas.

Cast 
 Venu Nagavally as Devadas
 Ramya Krishna as Chandramukhi
 Parvathy 
 Madhu
 Nedumudi Venu
 Balan K. Nair 
 Ganesh Kumar
 Bahadoor
 Jagathy Sreekumar
 Bobby Kottarakkara 
 Aryad Gopalakrishnan 
 Kaviyoor Ponnamma 
 Meena 
 Master Suresh 
 Baby Sindhu (Sindhu Varma)

Soundtrack
The music was composed by K. Raghavan and Mohan Sithara, with lyrics by P. Bhaskaran.

External links

1989 films
1980s Malayalam-language films
Devdas films
Films about courtesans in India
Films based on Indian novels